Sapronovo is a rural locality (a selo) and the administrative center of Sapronovsky Selsoviet of Mazanovsky District, Amur Oblast, Russia. The population was 544 as of 2018. There are 17 streets.

Geography 
Sapronovo is located on the right bank of the Birma River, 35 km south of Novokiyevsky Uval (the district's administrative centre) by road. Bichura is the nearest rural locality.

References 

Rural localities in Mazanovsky District